The Stockton Blues was a California state militia unit organized in 1857 and disbanded in 1861 due to secessionist dissension. Union men then reformed under the Stockton Union Guard, 1861–1866.

See also
List of California State Militia civil war units

References

External links
California  State Military Museum; California State Militia and National Guard Unit Histories, Stockton Blues
 Inventory of the Military Department. Militia Companies Records, 1849-1880

History of California
California in the American Civil War
Military units and formations established in 1857
1857 establishments in California